The following is a list of notable individuals who were born in and/or have lived in Great Falls, Virginia.

Arts and entertainment
Del Ankers, cinematographer, director and film producer
Paula Cale, actress
Kate Cordsen, photographer and contemporary artist
Holly Twyford, actress

Business
Steve Case, founder of AOL
Jacqueline Mars, Mars Candy heir
Stephen L. Norris, co-founder of The Carlyle Group
David Rubenstein, co-founder of The Carlyle Group

Military
Kenneth P. Moritsugu, former United States Public Health Service Surgeon General of the United States
Sidney T. Weinstein, former United States Army Lieutenant General

Politics and government
Elizabeth Moore Aubin, United States Ambassador to Algeria
Bruce Bartlett, historian and government official
Tony Blankley, political analyst and press secretary
Brian S. Brown, political activist
Louis Freeh, director of FBI
Sung Kim, U. S. Ambassador to the Philippines
Peggy Noonan, author and columnist for The Wall Street Journal
Barbara Olson, lawyer and television commentator killed in the September 11 attacks
Theodore Olson, lawyer and former Solicitor General
Bernard D. Rostker, former U.S. Department of Defense official
Toby Roth, former member of the United States House of Representatives
Rick Santorum, former United States Senator and Presidential candidate
Mark D. Siljander, former member of the United States House of Representatives
Stansfield Turner, former Director of Central Intelligence and President of the Naval War College
Glenn Youngkin, 74th Governor of Virginia

Sports
Gilbert Arenas, professional basketball player formerly of the Washington Wizards
Brendan Healy, professional lacrosse player for the Washington Bayhawks
Jimmy Lange, professional boxer
Armin Mahbanoozadeh, figure skater
Art Monk, former wide receiver for Washington Redskins
Dan Snyder, owner of Washington Redskins
Jim Speros, former football coach and team owner
Kate Ziegler, Olympic swimmer

References

Great Falls, Virginia
Great Falls